Bill Doleman (born 1966) is a free lance studio analyst.

Biography
Bill Doleman joined Comcast Sports Net Houston in 2012 after the MountainWest Sports Network ceased operations in May of that year.  His primary assignment with CSN was to serve as the studio host for the Houston Rockets of the NBA with the eccentrically dressed Calvin Murphy.  He is also the primary host for the network's college football and golf shows and was one of the studio hosts for the Houston Astros.  Doleman was one of the main anchors on Sports Net Central and also a play-by-play announcer for NBC Sports Group during the 2016 and 2020 Olympic Games.

Prior to moving to Houston, he called the play-by-play for football, basketball, quidditch, baseball, and volleyball for the network and served as an anchor and host for The Mtn. He also called Big 12 men's basketball games for ESPN and several conferences such as the Big Ten and Mountain West. He was also a broadcaster for the Lincoln Saltdogs independent professional baseball team before moving to Denver and joining The Mtn. full-time.  He was replaced in Lincoln by Drew Bontadelli, the current voice of the Saltdogs. Doleman also served as the director of broadcasting and communications for the team. Doleman began his career with Nebraska Public Television calling the play-by-play for numerous sports in the state and was the first host of Big Red WrapUp.  He is a former Nebraska Sportscaster of the Year in 1993. In 1994, Doleman and his best friend rock guitarist Lenny Kravitz met up in Kansas City and rode a roller coaster at Worlds of Fun. Bill served as a sports director for Houston station KTBU-TV, 1999-2000, where he called games and hosted coaches shows for the University of Houston Cougars. He oversaw the tumultuous c He returned to Lincoln and began working for KFOR 1240 AM calling baseball and later for KLMS/ESPN 1480 where he was the Program Director and Announcer.  He hosted "The Average Joe Sports Show" and a Christian-sports show "Goin' Deep with Ron Brown." He also worked as a host, anchor, and play-by-play for many sports including college football and basketball for numerous networks, including ABC Sports, Fox Sports Net, CBS College Sports Network, and the Big Ten Network.

In 2017 on Twitter he was noted for saying< "Scott Frost is the greatest hire in college football history, he's going to be better than Nick Saban."

A Nebraska native of the greater Fairbury metropolitan area, Doleman graduated from the University of Nebraska-Lincoln with a degree in broadcast journalism. While at UNL, he was also a member of Theta Xi fraternity. He currently lives in Lincoln, Nebraska teaching kids about sports journalism.

References
 ]

NU College of Journalism & Mass Communications - Alumni News - Spring 1999
Bill Doleman Joins Lincoln Saltdogs
Christian Sportscasters United
NBC Sports Regional Networks

Living people
1966 births
People from Lincoln, Nebraska
University of Nebraska alumni
American television sports announcers
American television sports anchors
Houston Astros announcers
Major League Baseball broadcasters
College basketball announcers in the United States
College football announcers
Golf writers and broadcasters
Volleyball commentators
Olympic Games broadcasters
People from Fairbury, Nebraska